Kate Kavanagh may refer to:

Kate Kavanagh, fictional character in Fifty Shades (novel series)
Kate Kavanagh, fictional character in Kavanagh QC

See also
Kate Cavanagh, social worker
Katherine Kavanaugh